Positive deconstruction, in relation to Christian apologetics, is a term first used by Nick Pollard in Evangelism Made Slightly Less Difficult (drawing on Dr. David Cook), to describe a methodology for engaging with worldviews in Christian apologetics. The process is one of deconstruction because it involves 'dismantling' the worldview in order to identify areas of conflict with a Christian worldview. It is positive because the intention is not to destroy a person's ideas and belief system, but to build on areas of agreement between the two worldviews in order to argue for the truth of the Christian worldview.

Pollard identifies four key aspects:

 Identify the worldview: What beliefs, values and attitudes are being communicated?
 Analyse the worldview, primarily in terms of the correspondence, coherence and pragmatic theories of truth
 Affirm the truth: what aspects of the worldview are in agreement with a Christian worldview?
 Deny the error: what aspects of the worldview are in conflict with a Christian worldview?

Tony Watkins develops this in relation to film in Focus: The Art and Soul of Cinema. He aims to make the positive deconstruction process more accessible, and accordingly re-labels the four aspects of the process (pp. 31–45):

 Analyse the worldview, in which he suggests a five-part framework for considering worldviews:
 What is reality?
 What does it mean to be human?
 How do we know what the good is?
 How do we know anything at all?
 What is the fundamental problem confronting all human beings, and what is the solution?
 Evaluate the worldview (as with Pollard's second stage, this is terms of correspondence, coherence, pragmatism)
 Celebrate the good
 Challenge the bad

References

Further reading
 Dahle, Lars. 'Acts 17 as an apologetic model', Whitefield Briefing, Vol. 7, No. 1 (March 2002). Also published on Culturewatch.org.
 Dahle, Lars. 'Encountering and Engaging a Postmodern Context: Applying the apologetic model in Acts 17', Whitefield Briefing, Vol. 7, No. 6 (December 2002). Also published on Culturewatch.org.
 
 Pollard, Nick; Harris, Paul; Watkins, Tony and Wall, Phil. Beyond the Fringe: Reaching People Outside the Church (Leicester: IVP, 1999) 
 Watkins, Tony. Focus: The Art and Soul of Cinema (Milton Keynes: Damaris Books, 2007)

Apologetics
Consensus reality
Deconstruction